Lulu Basinyi (born 30 May 1976) is a Botswana sprinter. He competed in the men's 4 × 400 metres relay at the 2000 Summer Olympics.

References

External links
 

1976 births
Living people
Athletes (track and field) at the 2000 Summer Olympics
Botswana male sprinters
Olympic athletes of Botswana
Place of birth missing (living people)